Howard Quail Davies (28 November 1906 – October 1993) was a South African athlete who competed in the 1930 British Empire Games.

At the 1930 Empire Games, he won the silver medal in the 120 yards hurdles event. He also participated in the 440 yards hurdles competition but was eliminated in the heats. With the South African relay team, he won the bronze medal in the 4×110 yards contest.

External links
commonwealthgames.com results
Howard Davies' obituary 

1906 births
1993 deaths
South African male sprinters
South African male hurdlers
Athletes (track and field) at the 1930 British Empire Games
Commonwealth Games silver medallists for South Africa
Commonwealth Games bronze medallists for South Africa
Commonwealth Games medallists in athletics
Medallists at the 1930 British Empire Games